The 1867 Raglan by-election was a by-election held on 4 June 1887 in the  electorate during the 4th New Zealand Parliament.

The by-election was caused by the resignation of the incumbent MP Joseph Newman on 9 April 1867.

The by-election was won by James Farmer.

Results

References

Raglan 1867
1867 elections in New Zealand
Politics of Waikato
June 1867 events